Adam Maulana (born March 26, 1997) is an Indonesian professional footballer who plays as a defender for Persikab Bandung.

Honours

Club 
Persebaya Surabaya
 Liga 2: 2017

References

External links
 Adam Maulana at Soccerway
 Adam Maulana at Liga Indonesia

1997 births
Living people
Indonesian footballers
Persebaya Surabaya players
Persiba Balikpapan players
Liga 2 (Indonesia) players
Sportspeople from Surabaya
Association football defenders